Makar Dhwaja Darogha was an Indian classical dancer and guru, known for his expertise in the classical dance form of Chhau. He died on 17 February 2014 at his residence in Saraikela in Jharkhand, India due to old age illnesses. The Government of India honored him in 2011, with the fourth highest civilian award of Padma Shri.

See also
 Chhau dance

References

External links

2014 deaths
Recipients of the Padma Shri in arts
Performers of Indian classical dance
People from Seraikela Kharsawan district
Indian male dancers
Dancers from Jharkhand
20th-century Indian dancers
Chhau exponents